Tomilayo Adekanye is a Nigerian professor of agricultural economics. She was the first female professor in any agricultural-related field in Nigeria, and the first in agricultural economics in Africa. She commenced her university teaching career as staff member of Department of Agricultural Economics at Obafemi Awolowo University (then University of Ife) between 1966 and 1975. She moved subsequently to University of Ibadan's Department of Agricultural Economics, as Lecturer I (1975), rising to the ranks of Senior Lecturer (1977), Associate Professor (Reader), and, in 1980, to the full position of Professor in 1983. Between 1990–91, she was the Commissioner for Trade and Investment in Oyo State. She is also a one-time commissioner of agriculture in the state. She is married to Bayo Adekanye, a professor of political science and chairman of the governing council of Chrisland University. Organizations and agencies with which she has previously consulted at the international level include ECA, ILO, FAO, IFAD, UNDP, UNICEF, UNIFEM, and Ford Foundation.

Education and publications 
According to Google Scholar, her most cited paper is a 1988 4-year study titled "Women and Rural Poverty: Some Considerations From Nigeria", which focuses on how women engaging in agriculture in Southwestern Nigeria are not fairly incorporated in the system, thereby causing them to lag behind men in terms of development. She presently lectures at Babcock University. In 1984, she conducted another study that cuts across women in the main ethnic groups in Nigeria. The findings from the study titled, Women in agriculture in Nigeria: Problems and policies for development, was that for women to be able to maximize what agriculture has to offer, there needs to be a mechanism in-place that will ensure both academic and financial stability. She has also authored several books on agriculture, such as: Women in Agriculture in Nigeria (Addis, ECA, 1981), Women in Agriculture (Institute of African Studies, University of Ibadan, 1988), Readings in Agricultural Marketing (Ibadan, Longman, 1988), African Women in Agriculture (Ibadan, CEGGAD, 2004), and some 75 other publications contributed as chapters in books, articles in peer-reviewed and learned journals, and monographs and technical reports.

References 

1942 births
Living people
20th-century Nigerian economists
Nigerian women economists
People from Oyo State
21st-century Nigerian economists